Amanda Jones may refer to:
Amanda Jones (inventor) (1835–1914), American author and inventor
Amanda Jones (Miss USA) (born c. 1951), 1973 titleholder
Mandy Jones, British cyclist 
Amanda Jones (composer), born 1988, American composer
Amanda Jones (actress), New Zealand actress in Among the Cinders
Amanda Jones, a fictional character played by Lea Thompson in the film Some Kind of Wonderful
"Miss Amanda Jones", song by the Rolling Stones on their album Between the Buttons